The Death of Poor Joe is a 1901 British short silent drama film, directed by George Albert Smith, which features the director's wife Laura Bayley as Joe, a child street-sweeper who dies of disease on the street in the arms of a policeman. The film, which went on release in March 1901, takes its name from a famous photograph posed by Oscar Rejlander after an episode in Charles Dickens' 1853 novel Bleak House, and is the oldest known surviving film featuring a Dickens character. The film was discovered in 2012 by British Film Institute curator Bryony Dixon, after it was believed to have been lost since 1954. Until the discovery, the previous oldest known Dickens film was Scrooge, or, Marley's Ghost, released in November 1901.

Cast
 Laura Bayley as Joe
 Tom Green as the policeman

See also
 List of rediscovered films

References

External links
 
 The Death of Poor Joe in the BFI Film & TV Database
 
 Film on YouTube

1901 films
1901 drama films
1901 short films
1900s rediscovered films
1900s British films
British drama films
British silent short films
British black-and-white films
Films based on works by Charles Dickens
Articles containing video clips
Films directed by George Albert Smith
Rediscovered British films
Works based on Bleak House
Silent drama films